Manfred Naumann (born 21 June 1933) is a German long-distance runner. He competed in the marathon at the 1964 Summer Olympics.

References

1933 births
Living people
Athletes (track and field) at the 1964 Summer Olympics
German male long-distance runners
German male marathon runners
Olympic athletes of the United Team of Germany
People from Stein, Limburg
Sportspeople from Limburg (Netherlands)
20th-century German people